"I've Always Got You" is a song by the American singer Robin Zander (of the rock band Cheap Trick), released in 1993 as the lead single from his debut solo album Robin Zander. It was written by Mike Campbell, Zander and J.D. Souther, and produced by Jimmy Iovine and Campbell.

"I've Always Got You" reached No. 13 on the Billboard Album Rock Tracks chart, and No. 64 on Canada's RPM Top 100 Singles chart. A music video was filmed to promote the single.

Release
"I've Always Got You" was released on CD and cassette, with a one-track promotional CD also being issued in the US. All versions of the single featured the track "Everlasting Love" as the B-side, taken from Robin Zander. The German version of the single included another B-side, "Stone Cold Rhythm Shake", which was exclusive to the release.

Critical reception
On its release, Billboard described the song as a "bright and breezy pop strummer" and a "promising peek" into Zander's solo debut. They added, "Richly textured arrangement has crisp guitar doodling, and layers of Zander's engaging and distinctive voice. At the core of the track is an instantly memorable chorus that will open doors at adult-leaning pop and album-rock stations." Hard Report considered the song to be a "perfect, mid-tempo, summer ballad with fresh guitars and optimistic appeal".

In a review of Robin Zander, Len Righi of The Morning Call described the song as a "touching tale of need" which "calls to mind Tom Petty, the Byrds and the Traveling Wilburys." Gerry Krochak of The Leader-Post commented, "'I've Always Got You' has hit written all over it, with its big hook and instantly memorable chorus." St. Petersburg Times described the song as one of the album's "radio-ready cuts". In a retrospective review of the album, AllMusic described the song as "taut, power pop". In his 2017 book Still Competition: The Listener's Guide to Cheap Trick, Robert Lawson noted the song "could be a deep cut from Tom Petty's Full Moon Fever".

Track listing
CD single
"I've Always Got You" - 3:40
"Everlasting Love" - 4:34

CD single (American promo)
"I've Always Got You" - 3:40

CD single (German Maxi-CD release)
"I've Always Got You" - 3:40
"Everlasting Love" - 4:34
"Stone Cold Rhythm Shake" - 4:48

Cassette single
"I've Always Got You" - 3:40
"Everlasting Love" - 4:34

Personnel
 Robin Zander - lead vocals, acoustic guitar on "I've Always Got You"
 Mike Campbell - guitar, synthesizer, Dobro resonator guitar, bass guitar on "I've Always Got You", guitar on "Stone Cold Rhythm Shake"
 Carlos Vega - drums on "I've Always Got You"
 J.D. Souther - additional vocals on "I've Always Got You"
 Mick MacNeil - keyboards on "Everlasting Love"
 Gary Taylar - guitar on "Everlasting Love"
 Derrick Forbes - bass guitar on "Everlasting Love"
 Brian McGhee - drums on "Everlasting Love"
 Bonnie Hayes - keyboards on "Stone Cold Rhythm Shake"
 Richard Ruce - bass guitar on "Stone Cold Rhythm Shake"
 Clem Burke - drums on "Stone Cold Rhythm Shake"
 Maria McKee, Edna Wright - background vocals on "Stone Cold Rhythm Shake"

Production
 Jimmy Iovine - producer of "I've Always Got You", Everlasting Love" and "Stone Cold Rhythm Shake"
 Mike Campbell - producer of "I've Always Got You"
 David Bianco - mixing on "I've Always Got You"
 Robin Zander - producer of "Everlasting Love" and "Stone Cold Rhythm Shake"
 Phil Kaffel - mixing on "Everlasting Love", co-producer and engineering on "Stone Cold Rhythm Shake"
 Mick MacNeil - co-producer and programming on "Everlasting Love"
 Bob Clearmountain - mixing on "Stone Cold Rhythm Shake"

Other
 Tom Whalley - A&R direction
 Ken Adamany - management
 Gabrielle Raumberger - art direction
 Dylan Tran - typography
 Mark Seliger - photography

Charts

References

1993 songs
1993 singles
Robin Zander songs
Songs written by Mike Campbell (musician)
Songs written by J. D. Souther
Songs written by Robin Zander
Song recordings produced by Jimmy Iovine
Interscope Records singles
Atlantic Records singles